India competed at the 2022 World Athletics Championships in Eugene, Oregon from 15 to 24 July 2022. India had entered 21 athletes.India won their first silver in world athletic championship.since their debut in games.Neeraj Chopra became first male to win a medal in world Athletics championship.

Medalists

Results

Men
Noah Nirmal Tom and Amoj Jacob did not compete (both were named to the 4x400 relay team).
Track and road events

Field events

Women
Aishwarya Mishra did not compete.
Track and road events

Field events

References

India
World Championships in Athletics
2022